Dezső Fábián (17 December 1918 – 6 October 1973) was a Hungarian water polo player who competed in the 1948 Summer Olympics and in the 1952 Summer Olympics.

He was born and died in Budapest.

Fábián was part of the Hungarian team which won the silver medal in the 1948 tournament. He played three matches.

Four years later he was a member of the Hungarian team which won the gold medal in the Olympic tournament. He played one match.

See also
 Hungary men's Olympic water polo team records and statistics
 List of Olympic champions in men's water polo
 List of Olympic medalists in water polo (men)

External links
 

1918 births
1973 deaths
Hungarian male water polo players
Water polo players at the 1948 Summer Olympics
Water polo players at the 1952 Summer Olympics
Olympic gold medalists for Hungary in water polo
Olympic silver medalists for Hungary in water polo
Medalists at the 1952 Summer Olympics
Medalists at the 1948 Summer Olympics
Water polo players from Budapest
20th-century Hungarian people